Richard Cocks (1566–1624) was the head of the British East India Company trading post in Hirado, Japan, between 1613 and 1623, from its creation, and lasting to its closure due to bankruptcy.

He was baptised on 20 January 1565 at St Chad's, Seighford, Staffordshire, the fifth of the seven children of Robert Cocks of Stallbrook, yeoman, and his wife, Helen. He was apprenticed in London and became a member of the Clothworkers' Company. He moved to Bayonne in Southern France and in 1605 he was recruited by Sir Thomas Wilson as a spy, where he monitored the movements of English Roman Catholic exiles who passed through the region on their way to Spain. After losing a large amount of money to a Portuguese con artist, he was no longer able to pay his English creditors and returned home in disgrace. His reputation at home was ruined and he decided to leave England to start a new life in Japan.

During his time in Japan, he wrote a very detailed diary, relating the history of the trading post, the situation of Japan at the time, and the activities of English merchants in Japan, among whom was also the English pilot and samurai, retainer to Tokugawa Ieyasu, William Adams, with whom he wrote he had visited the residence of the Imperial Fleet Admiral, under orders from the Shogun, to discuss the possibility, required logistics, and outcome of an invasion of the Philippines in 1616. 
The surviving documents of the trading post (letters, accounts and journals) are a unique source of first-hand accounts of Early Modern Japan through secular Western eyes.

After the trading post was closed in 1623, Cocks sailed for England on the Anne Royal but died and was buried at sea on 27 March 1624 in the southern Indian Ocean.

References

External links
 

English businesspeople
English diarists
British expatriates in Japan
British East India Company civil servants
1560s births
1624 deaths
16th-century English writers
16th-century male writers
17th-century English writers
17th-century English male writers